Tombola or variants may refer to:

 Tombola (game), a lottery-type game originating in Italy
 Tombola (bingo company), a UK-based online gaming company 
Tómbola (film), 1961 Spanish musical film with child singer and actress Marisol
Tómbola (TV series), an American Spanish-language entertainment-news TV show
 Operation Tombola, a Second World War Allied operation in Italy
 Moussier Tombola, a French comedian

See also
 Tombolo, an attached island formed by erosion and wave action
 Tombolo, Veneto, a municipality in the Italian region Veneto
 Bingo (United Kingdom) a game of chance originating in Italy